Quirino station (also known as Quirino Avenue station) is an elevated Manila Light Rail Transit (LRT) station situated on Line 1. The station serves Malate in Manila and is located at the meeting point of Taft Avenue, Quirino Avenue, and San Andres Street. The station is named after Quirino Avenue, which is in turn named after former president Elpidio Quirino.

Quirino Avenue station is the sixth station for trains headed to Roosevelt and the fifteenth station for trains headed to Baclaran.

Transportation links
Quirino station is served by buses, jeepneys, and UV Express plying Taft Avenue and nearby routes, cycle rickshaws, and taxis. They stop near the station and can even be used for trips in and around Malate.

See also

List of rail transit stations in Metro Manila
Manila Light Rail Transit System

Manila Light Rail Transit System stations
Railway stations opened in 1984
Buildings and structures in Malate, Manila